Lakeview is a census-designated place (CDP) in Riverside County, California, United States. The population was 2,104 at the 2010 census, up from 1,619 at the 2000 census.  The community is named for nearby Mystic Lake.

Geography

Demographics

2010
At the 2010 census Lakeview had a population of 2,104. The racial makeup of Lakeview was 1,117 (53.1%) White, 15 (0.7%) African American, 48 (2.3%) Native American, 7 (0.3%) Asian, 2 (0.1%) Pacific Islander, 842 (40.0%) from other races, and 73 (3.5%) from two or more races. Hispanic or Latino of any race were 1,350 persons (64.2%).

The census reported that 2,089 people (99.3% of the population) lived in households, 15 (0.7%) lived in non-institutionalized group quarters, and no one was institutionalized.

There were 538 households, 285 (53.0%) had children under the age of 18 living in them, 347 (64.5%) were opposite-sex married couples living together, 63 (11.7%) had a female householder with no husband present, 40 (7.4%) had a male householder with no wife present.  There were 31 (5.8%) unmarried opposite-sex partnerships, and 4 (0.7%) same-sex married couples or partnerships. 67 households (12.5%) were one person and 31 (5.8%) had someone living alone who was 65 or older. The average household size was 3.88.  There were 450 families (83.6% of households); the average family size was 4.12.

The age distribution was 681 people (32.4%) under the age of 18, 220 people (10.5%) aged 18 to 24, 523 people (24.9%) aged 25 to 44, 494 people (23.5%) aged 45 to 64, and 186 people (8.8%) who were 65 or older.  The median age was 30.9 years. For every 100 females, there were 98.1 males.  For every 100 females age 18 and over, there were 103.3 males.

There were 599 housing units at an average density of 183.8 per square mile, of the occupied units 390 (72.5%) were owner-occupied and 148 (27.5%) were rented. The homeowner vacancy rate was 1.0%; the rental vacancy rate was 4.5%.  1,475 people (70.1% of the population) lived in owner-occupied housing units and 614 people (29.2%) lived in rental housing units.

2000
At the 2000 census there were 1,619 people, 476 households, and 392 families in the CDP. The racial makeup of the CDP was 67.5% White, 0.9% African American, 2.7% Native American, 0.4% Asian, 0.1% Pacific Islander, 23.4% from other races, and 5.1% from two or more races. Hispanic or Latino of any race were 43.7%.

Of the 476 households 40.3% had children under the age of 18 living with them, 65.1% were married couples living together, 10.7% had a female householder with no husband present, and 17.6% were non-families. 12.6% of households were one person and 4.2% were one person aged 65 or older.  The average household size was 3.4 and the average family size was 3.7.

The age distribution was 32.7% under the age of 18, 8.2% from 18 to 24, 27.7% from 25 to 44, 21.7% from 45 to 64, and 9.6% 65 or older.  The median age was 33 years. For every 100 females, there were 102.9 males.  For every 100 females age 18 and over, there were 97.5 males

The median household income was $46,141, the median family income  was $46,941. Males had a median income of $39,355 versus $27,813 for females. The per capita income for the CDP was $13,591.  About 12.4% of families and 16.9% of the population were below the poverty line, including 21.1% of those under age 18 and 16.8% of those age 65 or over.

Government

References

Census-designated places in Riverside County, California
Census-designated places in California